The Original Sound of Sheffield '78/'82 is a best-of compilation by Cabaret Voltaire.  It is the third in a series of best-of compilations for the band, also including The Original Sound of Sheffield '83/'87 and Conform to Deform '82/'90.  Compared to the other two compilations, however, this one focuses on a more primal period of Cabaret Voltaire's career, with more experimentation than their later, house-influenced work.  The booklet includes an interview with the band as well as photos from the era.

Track listing

References

2002 greatest hits albums
Cabaret Voltaire (band) albums
Mute Records compilation albums